Khara Kadhi Bolu Naye is a 1987 Marathi film directed by Ravi Namade.

Plot
The story revolves around a person Mr. Khote (Sharad Talwalkar). Mr. Khote is a successful businessman. But he has cheated many people in business. When two young guys Dilip and his cousin Vijay Laxmikant Berde wish to start a business, Vijay's father (Mr. Khote's best friend) takes them to Mr. Khote. He wants Mr. Khote to teach these young kids about business. At home Mr. Khote has a wife Mrs Saralabai, Saralabai's brother Mama, a daughter Priya and an extra-marital affair with Chanchalabai. Chanchalabai has a daughter Baby from Mr. Khote. Later Vijay falls in love with Priya. But Mr. Khote prefers Dilip as his son-in-law.

When the training starts, Mr. Khote proves Vijay and Dilip cheating is probably the only way to succeed in business. Whereas the young boy Vijay (Laxmikant Berde) is trying to prove that only truth would lead you to success. Mr. Khote also has a close Parasi friend named Pestan. Khote cheats with him several times.

Mr. Khote shows Vijay how to get benefited by cheating others. Many incidences are shown where Mr. Khote proves this fact. But still Vijay is not ready to agree. To prove the sides of Truth and Lie they go for a bet whoever loses would lose 10,000 Rs. Others like Pestan, Dilip join the bet with their own share.

The bet would be for 24 hours and Vijay has promised he won't lie. He is also not allowed to keep mum when someone asks him a question. Story revolves around this and the funny part comes when Mr. Khote's other wife, Pestan's wife visits his house.

Cast
 Laxmikant Berde as Vijay
 Savita Prabhune as Priya Khote
 Sharad Talwalkar as Mr. Khote, Majnu
 Padma Chavan as Mrs. Saralabai Khote
 Deenasha Daji as Pestan Parsi
 Nayantara as Chanchala bai
 Chetan Dalvi as Dilip

Soundtrack
Background singers:
 Asha Bhosale
 Suresh Wadkar
 Chandrakant Kale

Track listing

References

1980s Marathi-language films
1987 films